The 2008 European Men's Fistball Championship was held in Stuttgart (Germany) from July 25 to July 27 with seven men's national teams: Austria, Catalonia, Czech Republic, Germany, Italy, Serbia and Switzerland. The matches were played in Stammheim district.

Teams
Group A

Group B

First round

Group A

Group B

Semifinals classification
Match classification 4th group A - 1st group B

5th-7th places

Final round

Semifinals

Finals
3rd-4th places

Final

Final standings

External links
International Fistball Association

Fistball
European international sports competitions
Sports competitions in Stuttgart
Fistball
2008 in German sport
2000s in Baden-Württemberg